Bizana Pondo Chiefs is a South African professional football club based in Mhlanga Location in Bizana, Eastern Cape, founded in 2015.

They earned promotion to the National First Division after winning the 2019–20 SAFA Second Division, but finished bottom in the 2020–21 National First Division, and were relegated to the 2020–21 SAFA Second Division.

They are known as the lions of Skoomplas.

Honours
 2019–20 SAFA Second Division

References

External links

Soccer clubs in South Africa
Association football clubs established in 2015
National First Division clubs
2015 establishments in South Africa